Days Go By (subtitled The Definitive Greatest Hits Collection) is a compilation album by Australian rock and pop singer Daryl Braithwaite, released in November 2017 through Sony Music Australia to coincide with Braithwaite's induction into the ARIA Hall of Fame.

The album spans Braithwaite's career highlights including his debut solo single, "You're My World" and features brand new music.

Track listing
CD1

CD2

Charts

Weekly charts

Year-end charts

Release history

References

2017 greatest hits albums
Daryl Braithwaite albums
Sony Music Australia albums
Compilation albums by Australian artists